Jerry Lee Eaves (born February 8, 1959) is an American head college basketball coach and athletic director at Simmons College of Kentucky in Louisville. He is the former head men's basketball coach at North Carolina Agricultural and Technical State University. Prior to the start of his coaching career, Eaves played in the National Basketball Association (NBA) for parts of four seasons.

Born and raised in Louisville, Kentucky, Eaves played at Ballard High School and the University of Louisville. He played professionally for the Utah Jazz, Atlanta Hawks and Sacramento Kings. Eaves competed on The Amazing Race 32 with his son Frank, which aired in 2020, and were placed ninth and being the third team eliminated.

References

External links
NBA career statistics

1959 births
Living people
African-American basketball coaches
African-American basketball players
American men's basketball players
Atlanta Hawks players
Ballard High School (Louisville, Kentucky) alumni
Basketball coaches from Kentucky
Basketball players from Louisville, Kentucky
Charlotte Hornets assistant coaches
Cincinnati Slammers players
Cleveland Cavaliers assistant coaches
College men's basketball head coaches in the United States
Howard Bison men's basketball coaches
Louisville Cardinals men's basketball coaches
Louisville Cardinals men's basketball players
McDonald's High School All-Americans
New Jersey Nets assistant coaches
North Carolina A&T Aggies men's basketball coaches
Parade High School All-Americans (boys' basketball)
Sacramento Kings players
Shooting guards
Sportspeople from Louisville, Kentucky
Utah Jazz draft picks
Utah Jazz players
The Amazing Race (American TV series) contestants
American expatriate basketball people in the Philippines
Alaska Aces (PBA) players
Philippine Basketball Association imports